Stojan Matavulj (born 24 February 1961) is a Croatian actor.

Filmography

Television roles 
 Ruža vjetrova as Stipe Odak (2011–2013)
 Instruktor as Strikan (2010)
 Zakon! as Zdravko Maček (2009)
 Sve će biti dobro as Pročelnik (2009)
 Odmori se, zaslužio si as Gospodin Feliks (2009)
 Stipe u gostima as Jozo Zec (2008–2009)
 Zauvijek susjedi as Mato (2008)
 Tužni bogataš as Karlo (2008)
 Bitange i princeze as Dinko Grabić (2008)
 Dobre namjere as Dioničar (2008)
 Bibin svijet as Susjed Kosić (2007)
 Cimmer fraj as Grgo (2007)
 Balkan Inc. as Jole (2006)
 Naši i vaši as Milin muž (2002)
 Novo doba as Šimleša (2002)
 Obiteljska stvar as Mile Aničić (1998)

Movie roles 
 Pjevajte nešto ljubavno as Ante (2007)
 Mrtvi kutovi (2005.)
 Što je muškarac bez brkova? as Luka (2005)
 Snivaj, zlato moje (2005)
 La femme musketeer as Rahael Mayor (2004)
 Slučajna suputnica as Arbutina (2004)
 Dream Warrior (2003)
 Crvena prašina as Inspector (1999)
 Božićna čarolija (1997)
 Sedma kronika (1996)
 Gospa (1994)
 Na rubu pameti (1993)
 The Sands of Time (1992)
 Čovjek koji je volio sprovode (1989)

References

External links

1961 births
Living people
20th-century Croatian male actors
21st-century Croatian male actors
Croatian male film actors
Croatian male stage actors
Croatian male television actors
Croatian Theatre Award winners
Croats of Vojvodina
Actors from Novi Sad
Serbian emigrants to Croatia